The 1941 Chicago White Sox season was the White Sox's 41st season in the major leagues, and their 42nd season overall. They finished with a record of 77–77, good enough for 3rd place in the American League, 24 games behind the first place New York Yankees.

Offseason 
 November 6, 1940: Thurman Tucker was purchased by the White Sox from the Oklahoma City Indians.

Regular season 
 May 15, 1941: In a game against the Chicago White Sox, Joe DiMaggio of the New York Yankees began his major league record 56-game hitting streak with a hit off Sox pitcher Eddie Smith.

Season standings

Record vs. opponents

Opening Day lineup 
 Bill Knickerbocker, 2B
 Luke Appling, SS
 Joe Kuhel, 1B
 Moose Solters, LF
 Dario Lodigiani, 3B
 Larry Rosenthal, RF
 Mike Kreevich, CF
 Mike Tresh, C
 Bill Dietrich, P

Notable transactions 
 August 1941: Dave Philley was purchased by the White Sox from the Monroe White Sox.

Roster

Player stats

Batting 
Note: G = Games played; AB = At bats; R = Runs scored; H = Hits; 2B = Doubles; 3B = Triples; HR = Home runs; RBI = Runs batted in; BB = Base on balls; SO = Strikeouts; AVG = Batting average; SB = Stolen bases

Pitching 
Note: W = Wins; L = Losses; ERA = Earned run average; G = Games pitched; GS = Games started; SV = Saves; IP = Innings pitched; H = Hits allowed; R = Runs allowed; ER = Earned runs allowed; HR = Home runs allowed; BB = Walks allowed; K = Strikeouts

Farm system

References

External links 
 1941 Chicago White Sox at Baseball Reference

Chicago White Sox seasons
Chicago White Sox season
Chicago White